Melissa Viviane Jefferson (born April 27, 1988), known professionally as Lizzo, is an American singer, rapper, and flutist. Born in Detroit, Michigan, she moved to Houston with her family when she was ten years old. After college she moved to Minneapolis, where she began her recording career in hip hop music. Prior to signing with Nice Life Recording Company and Atlantic Records, Lizzo released two studio albums—Lizzobangers (2013) and Big Grrrl Small World (2015). Lizzo's first major-label EP, Coconut Oil, was released in 2016.

Lizzo attained mainstream success with the release of her third studio album, Cuz I Love You (2019), which peaked at number four on the US Billboard 200. The album spawned the singles "Juice" and "Tempo". The deluxe version of the album included Lizzo's 2017 single "Truth Hurts" which became a viral sleeper hit two years after its initial release. It topped the US Billboard Hot 100, and became the longest-leading solo song by a female rapper. Around this time, her 2016 single "Good as Hell" also climbed the charts, reaching the top ten on the Billboard Hot 100 and UK Singles Chart. Lizzo received eight nominations at the 62nd Annual Grammy Awards, the most for any artist that year, including nominations for each of the "Big Four" categories; and eventually won the awards for Best Urban Contemporary Album, Best Pop Solo Performance for "Truth Hurts", and Best Traditional R&B Performance for the song "Jerome".

In 2021, Lizzo released the single "Rumors" featuring Cardi B, which debuted in the top five of the Billboard Hot 100. Her fourth studio album Special (2022) was preceded by its lead single "About Damn Time", which reached number one on the Billboard Hot 100 and won the Grammy Award for Record of the Year.

Aside from singing and rapping, Lizzo has also worked as an actor: she served as a voice actor in the animated film UglyDolls (2019) and appeared in the crime comedy-drama film Hustlers (2019). She is also the host of the Amazon Prime Video reality television series Lizzo's Watch Out for the Big Grrrls, for which she won the Primetime Emmy Award for Outstanding Competition Program. In 2019, Time named Lizzo as "Entertainer of the Year" for her meteoric rise and contributions to music. In addition to her four Grammy Awards, she has also won a Billboard Music Award, a BET Award, and two Soul Train Music Awards.

Early life and education 
Melissa Viviane Jefferson was born in Detroit, Michigan. When she was ten, her family relocated to Houston. She was classically trained as a flutist by Claudia Momen for eight years, from the age of ten until she graduated Alief Elsik High School in Alief, Houston in 2006, where she had started rapping. At the age of 14, she formed a musical group called Cornrow Clique with her friends. At this time she acquired the nickname "Lizzo", a variant of "Lissa" inspired by Jay-Z's "Izzo (H.O.V.A.)". In college, she studied classical music concentrating on flute at the University of Houston. At the age of 21, after the death of her father, she lived out of her car for a year as she tried to break into the music industry. She dropped out of college and moved to Minneapolis, Minnesota in 2011.

Career

2011–2015: Career beginnings and Lizzobangers 
While living in Minneapolis, Lizzo performed with groups including the electro soul-pop duo, Lizzo & the Larva Ink. During this time she helped form a three-piece all-female rap/R&B group: the Chalice. In 2012, the Chalice released their first album, We Are the Chalice, which was locally successful. In 2013, Lizzo was one of five artists to form the hip-hop group Grrrl Prty, which released two EPs before playing their final show at Rock the Garden and disbanding in 2016.

Lizzo's hip-hop-focused debut album, Lizzobangers, produced by Lazerbeak and Ryan Olson, was released on October 15, 2013. Killian Fox of The Guardian gave the album 4 stars out of 5, saying: "At times joyfully nonsensical, Lizzo's stream-of-consciousness rhymes can also be lethally pointed." The album topped Star Tribune's "Twin Cities Critics Tally 2013" list. Music videos were created for the songs "Batches & Cookies", "Faded", "Bus Passes and Happy Meals", and "Paris".

Lizzo toured the US and UK in the fall of 2013 opening for Har Mar Superstar, and additionally sang with his band. In October 2013, Lizzo won City Pages "Picked to Click" award for best new Twin Cities artist. The following month Time named her one of 14 music artists to watch in 2014. The album was subsequently re-released through Virgin Records. Later that year, Lizzo shared the stage with St. Paul and the Broken Bones, performing "A Change Is Gonna Come" together.

2014–2015: Big Grrrl Small World
Following the release of her first album, Lizzo immediately began working on new music. In 2014, she participated in StyleLikeU's What's Underneath project, where she removed her clothes as she talked about her relationships with her body. Inspired by the experience, she wrote "My Skin", which she described as "the thesis statement" of her forthcoming second album. In an interview with Vice, regarding body image, she said: You can wake up and change many things about your appearance, but the inevitability of waking up in your skin is what unifies us.In September 2014, Lizzo was featured alongside her Chalice bandmates Sophia Eris and Claire de Lune on the song "BoyTrouble" on Prince's and 3rdEyeGirl's album Plectrumelectrum. On working with Prince, Lizzo says the experience was "surreal... almost like a fairytale" and that it was "something I will never actually get over." On October 7, 2014, Lizzo appeared as the musical guest on the Late Show with David Letterman.

Lizzo's second studio album, Big Grrrl Small World, was released on December 11, 2015. Spin placed the album at number 17 on the "50 Best Hip-Hop Albums of 2015" list. Hilary Saunders of Paste praised Lizzo's "ability to rap and sing with equal tenacity." Her collaboration with Your Smith (then Caroline Smith), "Let 'Em Say", was featured in the season three premiere of Broad City.

2016–2018: Coconut Oil 
Lizzo was one of the hosts of MTV's short-lived 2016 live music performance series Wonderland. After signing with Atlantic Records that same year, Lizzo released her first major-label extended play, Coconut Oil, on October 7, 2016. "Good as Hell" was released as the lead single from the Coconut Oil on March 8, 2016, as part of the soundtrack for the 2016 film Barbershop: The Next Cut. Lizzo co-wrote each song on the album, while enlisting Ricky Reed, Christian Rich, Dubbel Dutch, and Jesse Shatkin for the album's production. The result was a departure from Lizzo's previous alternative hip hop releases. Lyrically, the extended play explores themes of body positivity, self-love, and the journey to those ideals.

Coconut Oil received positive reviews from music critics. Syra Aburto, writing for Nylon, wrote that "like the product it's named after, [Lizzo's] latest project, Coconut Oil, is essential for healthy living." Rolling Stone placed it at No. 14 on the list of the "20 Best Pop Albums of 2016". Commercially, Coconut Oil peaked at number 44 on US Top R&B/Hip-Hop Albums, making it Lizzo's first release to chart. To promote the extended play, Lizzo embarked on the Good as Hell Tour in 2017. In May she headlined The Infatuation's annual food festival, EEEEEATSCON and also appeared as a guest judge on the tenth season of RuPaul's Drag Race. In early 2018, Lizzo toured both with Haim and Florence and the Machine.After struggling with body issues at an early age, Lizzo became an advocate for body positivity and self-love as she attracted more mainstream attention, while making diversity the focus of her music, in regards to one's body, sexuality, race, and more. Her group of back-up dancers, the Big Grrrls, consists of all plus-size dancers. Highlighting body inclusivity and celebrating individuality, Lizzo appeared in ModCloth's "Say It Louder" campaign, which launched on June 11, 2018. In the same month, she sported the first plus-size outfit made for FIT's Future of Fashion runway show by Grace Insogna for her performance at NYC Pride's Pride Island event. Lizzo was profiled in the June 2018 Teen Vogue Music Issue.

2019–2020: Career breakthrough and Cuz I Love You
In 2019, in addition to her musical projects, Lizzo ventured into acting, with a voice performance in the animated film UglyDolls, and a supporting part in the crime comedy-drama film Hustlers.

"Juice", the lead single from her third studio album, was released on January 4, 2019, by Atlantic Records. The next month, she announced the title of the album, Cuz I Love You, which was eventually released on April 19, 2019. After the release of her album, she performed at the Coachella Music Festival for the first time.

The release of Cuz I Love You marked a turning point in Lizzo's career, as she began to attract more mainstream attention; the album debuted at number six on the Billboard 200 and eventually peaked at number four on the chart, three months after its initial release.

After inspiring an internet meme on the TikTok video sharing app and being featured in the 2019 Netflix film Someone Great, Lizzo's 2017 single, "Truth Hurts", began to gain popularity and was added to the deluxe version of Cuz I Love You. The single became a viral sleeper hit, and, in turn, increased interest for Cuz I Love You, which remained in the top 10 of the Billboard 200 for several months.

"Truth Hurts" has since become Lizzo's first number-one hit on the Billboard Hot 100. Lizzo became the third female rapper to top the Hot 100 without a featured artist. She also became the first black solo female R&B singer to claim the top spot on the Hot 100 since Rihanna's 2012 hit "Diamonds". A week later, on September 9, 2019, Cuz I Love You became certified gold by the RIAA with over 500,000 equivalent units sold. "Truth Hurts" spent seven weeks atop the Hot 100, tying for the most weeks at number one for a rap song by a female artist. The music video for the song, in which Lizzo "marries herself", has amassed more than 220 million views on YouTube. In an interview, she revealed that the initial lack of success for “Truth Hurts”—what she had thought to be her best song yet at the time—caused her to seriously consider quitting the music industry altogether.

Lizzo is also well known for her ability to play the flute. She began playing as a child, and has continued to improve her flute playing skills into adulthood. She has performed with her flute, which she has named Sasha Flute, in several of her musical performances, including when she performed "Truth Hurts" at the 2019 BET Awards. Her performance at the BET Awards earned her a standing ovation from the crowd, which included Rihanna.

Throughout the summer of 2019, Lizzo frequently performed, including on the West Holts stage at the Glastonbury Festival, and as a headliner at the Indianapolis and Sacramento pride festivals.

On July 23, 2019, Lizzo was nominated for Push Artist of the Year and Best New Artist at the 2019 MTV Video Music Awards. She performed a medley of "Truth Hurts" and "Good as Hell" at the 2019 MTV Video Music Awards; her performance received critical praise. Around this time, her 2016 single "Good as Hell" also climbed the charts around the world, reaching the top three of the Billboard Hot 100 and the top ten of the UK Singles Chart. The song also reached the top ten in Australia and Belgium.

Lizzo made her Saturday Night Live debut as a musical guest on the December 21, 2019 episode, which Eddie Murphy hosted. The episode was the final episode of both the year and the decade. In January 2020, Lizzo headlined FOMO Festival, performing in four Australian cities and Auckland, New Zealand. She also performed a sold-out show at the Sydney Opera House, where she had previously performed as a young flute player. She opened the 62nd Annual Grammy Awards with a medley of "Cuz I Love You" and "Truth Hurts", and won three awards at the ceremony. She received eleven nominations at the 2020 Billboard Music Award, winning one for Top Song Sales Artist. At the 2020 BET Awards, she became the first act to be nominated in both the R&B/pop and hip-hop artist categories in the same year.

2020–present: Special

In August 2020, Lizzo signed a production deal with Amazon Studios to develop new projects with them. Her first project was an unscripted reality competition series called Lizzo's Watch Out for the Big Grrrls. The show premiered on March 24, 2022.

On August 2, 2021, Lizzo announced the beginning of a "new era" with the song "Rumors", which was released on August 13, 2021. In an interview with Variety, Lizzo stated at the time that her upcoming album will be "a love album" and "one of the most musically badass, daring and sophisticated bodies of work I've done to date." The album was expected to release in late 2022, though at the time of the interview Lizzo had not finished it yet.

On March 23, 2022, Lizzo announced the single "About Damn Time" was to be released on April 14. After the song's release, Lizzo revealed the title for her fourth album, Special, and announced a release date of July 15.

She returned to Saturday Night Live, pulling double duty as host and musical guest for the April 16, 2022, episode.

On June 10, 2022, Lizzo released "Grrrls", the first promotional single from Special. The song's lyrics generated controversy because of the inclusion of the word spaz. The line was eventually replaced with "hold me back", following a statement from Lizzo where she commented that "as a fat black woman in America, I've had many hurtful words used against me so I understand the power words can have (whether intentionally or in my case, unintentionally)".

On July 15, 2022, Lizzo released her fourth studio album Special, which earned acclaim from music critics upon its release. Lizzoverse, an accompanying immersive cosmic light show experience set to Special, took place in New York City's Cipriani 25 Broadway and was livestreamed on Twitch. Following the release of Special, "About Damn Time" reached number one on the Billboard Hot 100 chart, maintaining the position for two weeks. In February 2022, "About Damn Time" won the coveted "Record of the Year" at the 65th Annual Grammy Awards, making Lizzo's first win in the major categories.

Lizzo is a contributing writer and producer on SZA's critically-acclaimed sophomore album SOS, co-writing the song "F2F." Lizzo also  collaborated with SZA on the remix of the song "Special," the title track of her album of the same name. 

On December 17, 2022, Lizzo returned to Saturday Night Live for her third appearance as a musical guest, with Austin Butler hosting.  Lizzo replaced the band Yeah Yeah Yeahs due to member Nick Zinner having pneumonia.

Personal life 
When asked about her sexuality in a June 2018 interview, Lizzo stated, "I personally don't ascribe to just one thing... That's why the colors for LGBTQ+ are a rainbow! Because there's a spectrum and right now we try to keep it black and white. That's just not working for me." She has a strong LGBTQ+ following and has dubbed her fans "Lizzbians". She later stated that she considers herself an ally and "leans heterosexual".

Throughout her career, Lizzo has been subject to body shaming. She is considered an image for body positivity and self-confidence. She partially credits social media, and the Internet in general, for changing the narrative around size and giving visibility to overweight women. In December 2019, Lizzo sparked controversy at a Los Angeles Lakers game, where on camera she danced and twerked to her song "Juice" while wearing a dress that revealed her thong. In an interview with CBS This Morning she said, "Anyone who knows me knows that this is how I've always been. This is how I've always liked to dress." On January 5, 2020, Lizzo stopped using Twitter; she cited "too many trolls" as the reason for her departure, adding: "I'll be back when I feel like it". Her Twitter account has since been updated by her management, while she remains active on her Instagram. Lizzo often discusses her mental health and its impact on her career.

Lizzo grew up attending the Church of God in Christ. As of June 2020, Lizzo is a vegan. In 2022, Lizzo was romantically linked to comedian Myke Wright. She donated $500,000 to Planned Parenthood after the United States Supreme Court overturned Roe v. Wade in Dobbs v. Jackson Women's Health Organization (2022).

In October 2021, she was criticized by some for calling Chris Brown her "favorite person in the whole fucking world".

Artistry 
Lizzo's music primarily incorporates hip hop, and is also infused with genres such as soul, R&B and funk-pop. Lizzo's influences include Missy Elliott, Lauryn Hill, and Beyoncé. Primarily a rapper, Lizzo incorporated singing into her debut record. She stated in an interview in 2018, "I was always afraid of being a singer, but then when I heard Lauryn Hill, I was like, maybe I can do both," further adding that her debut album was inspired by The Miseducation of Lauryn Hill, and Hill's ability of "rapping, singing, being political." She has cited Diana Ross as a fashion reference.

In an article for The Guardian in 2019, writer Leonie Cooper credited Lizzo for "the woodwind renaissance" as "the flute’s brightest champion" on the mainstream.

Discography 

Lizzobangers (2013)
Big Grrrl Small World (2015)
Cuz I Love You (2019)
Special (2022)

Filmography

Concert tours 
Headlining
 Good as Hell Tour (2017)
 Cuz I Love You Tour (2019)
Cuz I Love You Too Tour (2019)
The Special Tour (2022)

Supporting
 Haim – Sister Sister Sister Tour (2018)
 Florence and the Machine – High as Hope Tour (2018)

Awards and nominations

See also 

List of artists who reached number one in the United States

References

External links 

 

1988 births
Living people
21st-century American rappers
21st-century American women musicians
21st-century women rappers
African-American women rappers
American contemporary R&B singers
American women hip hop musicians
American women rappers
American flautists
American funk singers
American hip hop musicians
American hip hop singers
American women pop singers
American soul singers
Christians from Michigan
Christians from Minnesota
Christians from Texas
Feminist musicians
American LGBT rights activists
Midwest hip hop musicians
Rappers from Detroit
Rappers from Minneapolis
Sex-positive feminists
University of Houston alumni
Shorty Award winners
Women civil rights activists
Women flautists
21st-century African-American women
21st-century African-American musicians
20th-century African-American people
20th-century African-American women
21st-century flautists